Emmanuel Clément-Demange (born 4 February 1970) is a French former professional footballer who played as a forward.

See also
Football in France

References

External links

1970 births
Living people
Association football forwards
French footballers
Valenciennes FC players
USF Fécamp players
Wasquehal Football players
SC Abbeville players
Ligue 2 players
People from Saint-Dié-des-Vosges
Sportspeople from Vosges (department)
Footballers from Grand Est